The 2015–16 season was the Manitoba Junior Hockey League's (MJHL) 99th season of operation.  

This season was a near carbon copy of the previous season as the Portage Terriers dominated the league for the second year in a row.   The Terriers posted the best regular season record with 106 points and defeated the second-place team, the Steinbach Pistons, in the finals for their tenth Turnbull Cup.  Unlike the previous season, the Terriers were not able to advance past the 2016 Western Canada Cup.

Highlights
Terriers' head coach Blake Spiller wins the Canadian Junior Hockey League Coach of the Year award for the second consecutive season.
2016 NHL Entry Draft: Portage Terriers defenceman Dean Stewart is selected 188th overall by the Arizona Coyotes.

Standings

Playoffs

Post MJHL playoffs
Western Canada Cup
Portage Terriers finish third in round robin; defeated by Melfort Mustangs 3-2 in semi-final; defeated by Brooks Bandits 2-1 in runner-up game..

League awards 
 Steve "Boomer" Hawrysh Award (MVP): Brad Bowles, Portage
 MJHL Top Goaltender Award: Nathan Park, Portage
 Brian Kozak Award (Top Defenceman): Brett Orr, Portage
 Vince Leah Trophy (Rookie of the Year): Nick Henry, Portage
 Lorne Lyndon Memorial Trophy (Hockey Ability and Sportsmanship): Dan Taillefer, Steinbach
 Muzz McPherson Award (Coach of the Year): Blake Spiller, Portage
 Mike Ridley Trophy (Scoring Champion): Brad Bowles, Portage
 MJHL Playoff MVP: Brad Bowles, Portage

CJHL awards 
 CJHL Player of the Year (MJHL): Chase Brakel, Portage
 CJHL Coach of the Year: Blake Spiller, Portage
 CJHL Western All-star Team: Brad Bowles, Portage

References

External links
 MJHL Website
 2015-16 MJHL season at HockeyDB.com

Manitoba Junior Hockey League seasons
MJHL